David Datro Fofana (born 22 December 2002) is an Ivorian professional footballer who plays as a forward for Premier League club Chelsea and the Ivory Coast national team.

Club career

Early career
Fofana began his career in the Ivory Coast with Abidjan City, before joining AFAD on loan in 2019. He was heavily scouted by French, Belgian and Norwegian clubs. On 2 February 2021, Fofana signed a professional contract with Molde on a free transfer, signing for 4 years. He debuted with Molde in a 3–3 UEFA Europa League tie with Hoffenheim on 18 February 2021, scoring his side's third goal in the 74th minute.

Chelsea
On 28 December 2022, it was announced that Fofana would join English Premier League side Chelsea on 1 January 2023. On 8 January 2023, Fofana came off the bench to make his Chelsea debut in a 4–0 loss to Manchester City in the FA Cup.

International career
Fofana made his international debut with the Ivory Coast national team in a 2–0 CHAN 2020 loss to Niger on 22 September 2019.

Career statistics

Club

International

Honours
Molde
 Eliteserien: 2022
 Norwegian Cup: 2021–22

References

External links
 
 Molde FK Profile
 

2002 births
Living people
People from Gagnoa
Ivorian footballers
Ivory Coast international footballers
Association football forwards
Ligue 1 (Ivory Coast) players
Eliteserien players
Molde FK players
Chelsea F.C. players
Ivorian expatriate footballers
Ivorian expatriate sportspeople in Norway
Ivorian expatriate sportspeople in England
Expatriate footballers in Norway
Expatriate footballers in England